The Ruth and Emanuel Rackman Center for the Advancement of the Status of Women (in Hebrew: מרכז רקמן לקידום מעמד האשה), named in part after Emanuel Rackman, commonly known as the Rackman Center, is a research institution, think tank and legal aid clinic that is part of the Bar Ilan University Faculty of Law. It was established in 2001 with the goal of improving women's status and bringing an end to gender discrimination in Israeli society. The founding director of the centre is Ruth Halperin-Kaddari.

The Rackman Center aims to improve the legal status of women in Israel.  The Center is best known for advocating for the rights of agunot (that is, Jewish married women whose husbands will not to give them a religious divorce).

The Center also holds a legal aid clinic which for the benefit of women of low means at the Beit Din, the rabbinical courts.

The Center publishes three times a year 'The Law and Its Decisor (HaDin Ve’haDayan)', a unique innovative publication of Rabbinical court rulings on family issues.
Once a year the center holds a conference concerning different topics related to Jewish religious law, Halakha.

References

External links
 The Rackman Center website
The Rackman Center in court cases (in Hebrew)

Legal aid
Women's organizations based in Israel
Jewish law
Legal organizations based in Israel